Lingo, a contraction of language, often refers to jargon, but in a less formal or technical sense.

Lingo may also refer to:

Technology
 Lingo (programming language), one of several unrelated programming languages
 Lingo (VoIP Service operator), a VoIP service provided by Primus Telecommunications Inc
 Trade name of the Linn Sondek LP12 turntable's power supply
 LINGO (mathematical modeling language), designed for formulating and solving optimization problems

People
 Lingo (surname), a Scottish surname, including people with the name

Places
 Lingo, Missouri, a community in Macon County
 Lingo, New Mexico, a populated place in Roosevelt County
 Lingo Creek, Delaware
 Lingo House, an estate house near Carnbee, Fife, Scotland

Television game shows
 Lingo (American game show), an American television game show with multiple international adaptations that debuted in 1987
 Lingo (British game show), a short-lived UK game show produced from 1987 to 1988 and later revived in 2021
 Lingo (Canadian game show), a Canadian game show that aired on Radio-Canada in Quebec from 1998 to 2001
 Lingo (Dutch game show), Dutch television game show based on the North American format of the same name

Other uses
 Lingo (album), by Gang Gajang
 Lingo, the title character of The Lingo Show, a kids' TV show
 Lingo, regional variant of Lingam, the phallic representation of the Hindu god Shiva

See also
 Lingoes (program), multilingual translation software program
 Lingvo, the Esperanto word for language
 Linguo